Stolnik is a small village in the Tunjice Hills in the Municipality of Kamnik in the Upper Carniola region of Slovenia.

References

External links

Stolnik on Geopedia

Populated places in the Municipality of Kamnik